This article details the Bradford Bulls rugby league football club's 2022 season. This is the Bulls' fourth consecutive season in the Championship.

Season review

August 2021

Academy graduate and hooker Thomas Doyle penned a one year extension to stay with the Bulls.

September 2021

Halfback Jordan Lilley signed a two year extension to his contract. Widnes Vikings announced the signing of Bulls prop Levy Nzoungou for the 2022 season. Second-rower Brad England signed a one year extension with the club after impressing John Kear last season. Prop forward Anthony Walker signed a one year deal to stay at the Bulls. Bradford's first new signing came in the form of prolific try-scoring centre Kieran Gill who signed a 2 year deal from fellow Championship side Newcastle Thunder. Captain and prop forward Steve Crossley signed a one year extension to stay at the club. Young winger Joe Brown signed for Championship rivals York City Knights on a one year deal. Former two time loan prop Jordan Baldwinson returned to the club on a two year permanent deal from York. Winger Jack Sanderson left the club after one season. Centre Reece Hamlett joined the Swinton Lions for the 2022 season following numerous loan spells there the previous year. In what was seen as a major coup for the club, the Bulls announced the signing of Super League halfback Declan Patton on a one year deal from Salford Red Devils.

October 2021

The Bulls announced the signing of powerhouse prop Samy Kibula on a one year deal from Super League side Warrington Wolves. Bradford also signed fullback Elliot Hall on a two year deal from Batley Bulldogs. Young second row academy product Brad Gallagher was released from his contract in order to pursue other playing opportunities, it was later announced that he had signed with Newcastle Thunder. Winger David Foggin-Johnston signed a one year extension to his contract. Veteran hooker George Flanagan signed a one year extension to stay with the Bulls for the 2022 season. Rivals Featherstone Rovers announced the signing of Bradford fullback Brandon Pickersgill. Winger Matty Dawson-Jones announced that he was staying at the club for another year after initially considering retirement due to injuries he sustained last season. The Bulls revealed that they had signed fast-paced winger Ryan Millar from Sheffield Eagles on a two year deal. Young prop Ethan O'Hanlon and academy hooker Cameron Berry joined RFL League 1 side Hunslet R.L.F.C. for the 2022 season. Versatile youngster Billy Jowitt signed a 2 year extension to stay at the club. The Bulls continued to strengthen their pack for 2022 as they announced the signing of York City Knights second row forward Sam Scott on a one year deal.

November 2021

Veteran halfback Danny Brough announced his retirement on medical advice due to injuries sustained throughout his career. Prop forward Daniel Fleming signed a two year extension to stay at the club. Academy grown centre Ross Oakes signed a two year deal with rival RFL Championship side Sheffield Eagles. Highly rated youngster Ebon Scurr re-signed with the Bulls for two more years following Super League interest from Hull F.C. and reigning champions St Helens R.F.C. Vice captain Sam Hallas joined Championship rivals Newcastle Thunder on a two year deal. The Bulls signed young Leeds Rhinos academy players Coby Nichol and A.J. Wallace on one year deals. Young forward Bradley Ho signed a new two year extension to his contract. The 2022 fixtures were released and it was revealed that the Bulls would kick off the season away at Dewsbury Rams on January 30, before facing Sheffield Eagles at home the following week. The Bulls signed young forward Jamie Pye from St Helens R.F.C. on a three month trial basis. Bradford announced that their first pre-season friendly would take place on Boxing Day at Odsal Stadium against Halifax Panthers. Bradford also signed young halfback Charlie Harris from Castleford Tigers academy. The club released their home shirt for the upcoming season and in honor of the Super League win 25 years ago, the new shirt is modelled from the 1997 shirt. Another pre-season friendly was announced with the Bulls set to take on Batley Bulldogs in January at Odsal Stadium.

December 2021

The Bulls announced three season long loans in the form of prop Muizz Mustapha, hooker Corey Johnson and loose forward Jarrod O'Connor all from local rivals Leeds Rhinos, it was also revealed that the Bulls will play the Rhinos in a pre-season friendly on January 23. Trialist Jamie Pye left the club and signed a permanent deal with Oldham R.L.F.C. Super League side Hull F.C. revealed that they would once again partner the Bulls in a dual registration for the upcoming season, whilst also announcing they would face the Bulls in a friendly for Danny Brough's testimonial. The 2022 away kit and the squad numbers were released mid-month, with Elliot Kear taking the number 1 shirt. Other notable squad numbers were new signings Kieran Gill, Ryan Miller and Declan Patton took the 4,5 and 6 shirts, whilst Anthony Walker was promoted to number 8. The Boxing Day clash against Halifax was postponed due to adverse weather conditions.

January 2022

Bradford announced another friendly, this time against RFL League 1 side Midlands Hurricanes at Odsal on 12 February. As this is during the RFL Championship season, the Bulls will have a mixture of players not selected for the league game and academy/reserve players. The Bulls fell short in their first pre-season friendly losing 28-22 to Batley Bulldogs. Bradford put on a strong showing against a youthful Hull F.C. side as the Bulls ran out 42-12 winners in the second pre-season friendly with the highlights coming from David Foggin-Johnston's two tries and Dec Patton kicking six goals for a 100% conversion rate. The fixtures for the 2022 Summer Bash were released and it was revealed that the Bulls would face local rivals Halifax Panthers on the 30th July at Headingley Stadium. Bradford lost their last pre-season friendly 12-30 against historic rivals Leeds Rhinos in front of a huge 7,237 crowd. The Bulls got their 2022 RFL Championship season off to a great start with a comprehensive 46-16 win against Dewsbury Rams with Matty Dawson-Jones and new signing Keiran Gill both scoring two tries each.

February 2022

Young prop forward Bradley Ho joined RFL League 1 side Keighley Cougars on a season long loan. The draw for the 3rd and 4th Rounds of the 2022 Challenge Cup were made with the Bulls being drawn away to RFL Championship side London Broncos. New halfback Dec Patton signed a 1 year extension to his contract to keep him at the Bulls until the end of 2023. The Bulls came crashing back down to earth as they suffered a shock 28-14 loss to Sheffield Eagles in wet conditions, new centre Kieran Gill scored for the second consecutive game whilst centre Rhys Evans scored Bradford's other try. Forward Chester Butler joined the Bulls on loan from Super League side Huddersfield Giants on a season long loan. Bradford suffered a heavy 38-4 defeat at the hands of high flying Leigh Centurions with Gill scoring the only try for the Bulls. The game against Barrow Raiders was postponed due to a water logged pitch caused by Storm Eunice.

Milestones
 Round 1: Kieran Gill, Dec Patton, A.J. Wallace, Corey Johnson and Muizz Mustapha made their debuts for the Bulls.
 Round 1: Kieran Gill, Dec Patton and A.J. Wallace all scored their 1st tries for the Bulls.
 Round 1: Dec Patton kicked his 1st goal for the Bulls.
 Round 2: Ryan Millar made his debut for the Bulls.
 Round 3: Sam Scott and Chester Butler made their debuts for the Bulls.
 CCR4: Elliot Hall and Samy Kibula made their debuts for the Bulls.
 CCR4: Ryan Millar scored his 1st try for the Bulls.
 CCR4: Sam Scott scored his 1st try for the Bulls.
 CCR4: Kieran Gill scored his 1st hat-trick for the Bulls.
 Round 5: Jarrod O'Connor and Liam Tindall made their debuts for the Bulls.
 Round 5: Liam Tindall scored his 1st try for the Bulls.
 Round 4: Chester Butler and Elliot Hall scored their 1st try for the Bulls.
 Round 9: Sam Walters made his debut for the Bulls.
 Round 12: Tom Holroyd made his debut for the Bulls.
 Round 12: Dec Patton reached 100 points for the Bulls.
 Round 13: Jordan Baldwinson scored his 1st try for the Bulls.
 Round 14: Michael Hoyle made his debut for the Bulls.
 Round 15: Ben Evans made his 50th appearance for the Bulls.
 Round 15: Corey Johnson scored his 1st try for the Bulls.
 Round 16: Samy Kibula scored his 1st try for the Bulls.
 Round 18: Thomas Doyle made his 50th appearance for the Bulls.
 Round 19: George Flanagan Jr made his debut for the Bulls.
 Round 19: George Flanagan Jr scored his 1st try for the Bulls.
 Round 19: Elliot Kear scored his 25th try and reached 100 points for the Bulls.
 Round 20: Jacob Gannon made his debut for the Bulls.
 Round 21: Steve Crossley made his 150th appearance for the Bulls.
 Round 22: Myles Lawford made his debut for the Bulls.
 Round 23: Myles Lawford scored his 1st try for the Bulls.
 Round 23: Elliot Kear kicked his 1st goal for the Bulls.
 Round 24: Jacob Hookem made his debut for the Bulls.
 Round 24: Rhys Evans made his 50th appearance for the Bulls.
 Round 25: David Gibbons and Marcus Green made their debuts for the Bulls.

Pre-season friendlies

Player appearances
 Friendly games only

 = Injured

 = Suspended

RFL Championship

Matches

Table

Player appearances

 = Injured

 = Suspended

Challenge Cup

Player appearances

Club vs Country

Squad statistics

 Appearances and points include (Championship, Challenge Cup and Play-offs) as of 11 September 2022.

Transfers

In

Out

Notes

Explanatory notes

Citations 

Bradford Bulls
Bradford Bulls seasons